Reeferbilly Blowout is a live album from the Scottish neo-rockabilly group The Shakin' Pyramids. It was recorded on 24 May 1981 at the Kelvingrove Free Music Festival in Glasgow.

Personnel 
Davie Duncan – lead vocals
James G. Creighton – guitar, background vocals
"Railroad" Ken McLellan – guitar, background vocals

Track listing
 Teenage Boogie - 2:41
 Tennessee Rock 'N' Roll - 2:35
 Alright All Night - 3:30
 Sixteen Chicks - 2:25
 Shadow My Baby - 2:04
 Pretty Bad Blues - 2:25
 Wild Little Willie - 1:38
 Wash Machine Boogie - 2:33
 I Got a Baby - 3:44

References

1982 live albums
The Shakin' Pyramids albums